The Embassy of the United States in Lima is the official diplomatic mission of the U.S. to the Republic of Peru.

The current U.S. ambassador to Peru is Lisa D. Kenna.

History

Original buildings

Peru and the United States established relations on May 2, 1826, following Peru's independence from Spain, and relations were elevated to embassy level on 1920. The embassy of the United States was housed in different buildings before the opening of its current location.

In 1925, the U.S. government purchased a property in the Santa Beatriz area of Lima district to house its embassy. The three-floor building was designed by U.S. architect Frederick Larkin, in association with Leland W. King and Paul Jaquet, being built by the Peruvian construction company Florez y Costa, S.A.. Construction began in late 1942. 1,300 m² of the 11,600 m² property were dedicated to parks and gardens.

The building was designed in a Neocolonial style, featuring a replica travertine marble gate of the Palacio de Torre Tagle on its entrance, as well as on the second floor. The three floors of the building served as either storage (basement), a reception area (first floor) or bedrooms (second floor). The building currently serves as the residence of the U.S. ambassador.

The original terrain was bought in 1947.

The building was moved from its location near the Civic Centre to the Monterrico suburbs due to the internal conflict in Peru, as buildings affiliated with the United States were targeted by the terrorist group Shining Path on several occasions, as well as by the MRTA. By that point, the building had been bought by Clínica Internacional, owned by Grupo Breca, who moved into the building after the former tenants' departure.

Current building
The current building was built on the Monterrico residential area of Santiago de Surco. Construction took two years, and the building was inaugurated on July 4, 1995. The building was designed by Bernardo Fort-Brescia, whose façade features a blend of Incan and modern architecture, also features small windows as a security feature. The building's design was met with mixed reactions from both Peruvian and U.S. citizens.

In 2002, two security guards of the embassy were among the dead when a car bomb exploded in the El Polo shopping centre, located across the street. The building received no apparent damage, unlike the hotel and bank located near the location of the blast.

The building's façade was lit up with the national colors of Ukraine in response to Russia's invasion of the country on February 2022.

On January 25, 2023, the building's main entrance was blocked by protestors as part of a series of protests by supporters of former president Pedro Castillo.

See also
Peru–United States relations
Embassy of Peru, Washington, D.C.
List of ambassadors of the United States to Peru
List of ambassadors of Peru to the United States
Embassy of Russia, Lima
Embassy of China, Lima

References

Diplomatic missions of the United States
United States
Peru–United States relations
Buildings and structures in Lima
Buildings and structures completed in 1995
Brescia family